Tommy Town (7 April 1893 – 29 March 1957) was a Canadian middle-distance runner. He competed in the men's 1500 metres at the 1920 Summer Olympics.

References

1893 births
1957 deaths
Athletes (track and field) at the 1920 Summer Olympics
Canadian male middle-distance runners
Canadian male long-distance runners
Olympic track and field athletes of Canada
Place of birth missing
Olympic cross country runners